The Visa-Bikar 2002 was the forty-third season of the Icelandic national football cup. It started on May 22, 2002 and concluded with the final on September 28, 2002. The winners qualified for the first qualifying round of the UEFA Cup 2003–04.

First round

Second round

Third round

Fourth round

Quarterfinals

Semifinals

Final

External links
 RSSSF Page

2002 domestic association football cups
2002 in Icelandic football
2002